The Blaca Hermitage is located on the southern side of Brač island, in the Split-Dalmatia County of Croatia.

Site Description 
The hermitage was originally established in 1551 by two Glagolitic monks, and continued by successive generations of monks until 1963 with the death of Father Niko Miličević.

World Heritage Status 
This site was added to the UNESCO World Heritage Tentative List on January 29, 2007, in the Cultural category.

Gallery

See also
Tentative list of World Heritage Sites in Croatia

References 

History of Croatia by location
Brač
Roman Catholic monasteries in Croatia
Religious organizations established in the 1550s
1551 establishments in the Republic of Venice
1963 disestablishments in Croatia